Greenfields is a suburb east of Mandurah, located east of Mandurah's central area. It includes several aged care residences and a large recreation oval and centre.

The suburb is named after 'Greenfields Estate', the promotional name used by developers for the area in 1980.

It has also been known as Goegrup and Riverside Gardens.

See also
 Frederick Irwin Anglican School

References

Suburbs of Mandurah